Zyaroo (known as Ziaru also Romanized as Zīārūd; also known as Zīārū) is a village in Bala Khiyaban-e Litkuh Rural District, in the Central District of Amol County, Mazandaran Province, Iran. At the 2006 census, its population was 154, in 42 families.

References 

Populated places in Amol County
Tourist attractions in Amol